Old Buck may refer to:

 Nickname of James Buchanan (1791–1868), fifteenth president of the United States
 Nickname of Robert C. Buchanan (1811–1878), Union Army general during the American Civil War
 A Finnish malt whisky made by Panimoravintola Beer Hunter's
 Old Buck, a horse owned by Abraham Lincoln when he was a lawyer in Springfield, Illinois - see Old Bob, Old Buck's replacement

See also
Bedfordshire and Hertfordshire Regiment, a former British Army unit nicknamed "The Old Bucks"
Buck (nickname)
Histoire de M. Vieux Bois, a 19th century work published in English as The Adventures of Mr. Obadiah Oldbuck, sometimes referred to simply as Oldbuck

Lists of people by nickname